Kelath Aravindakshan Marar is an Indian Chenda artist. He hails from Ollur in Thrissur district of Kerala, India. Aravindakshan Marar is a regular presence in Thrissur Pooram's Ilanjiththara Melam, Peruvanam Pooram, Arattupuzha Pooram, Thrippunithura temple festival, Irinjalakuda Koodalmanikyam temple festival and other major temple festivals.

He was trained in percussion by his father Makoth Sankarankutty Marar. After completing his studies, he made his debut performance during Navarathri festival at Edakkunni temple at the age of 12.

Awards and recognition 
 Kerala Sangeetha Nataka Akademi Award for Kerala Musical Instructions - 2011 
 Sriramapada golden medal from Thriprayar Temple in 2019

References 

1942 births
Living people
Musicians from Thrissur